1998–99 Albanian Cup was the forty-seventh season of Albania's annual cup competition. It began in August 1998 with the First Round and ended in May 1999 with the Final match. The winners of the competition qualified for the 1999-2000 first round of the UEFA Europa League. Apolonia were the defending champions, having won their first Albanian Cup last season. The cup was won by Tirana.

The rounds were played in a two-legged format similar to those of European competitions. If the aggregated score was tied after both games, the team with the higher number of away goals advanced. If the number of away goals was equal in both games, the match was decided by extra time and a penalty shootout, if necessary.

First round
Games were played on August & September 1998

|}

Second round
All sixteen teams of the 1997–98 Superliga and First Division entered in this round. First and second legs were played in January 1999.

|}

Quarter-finals
In this round entered the 8 winners from the previous round.

|}

Semi-finals
In this round entered the four winners from the previous round.

|}

Final

References

 Calcio Mondiale Web

External links
 Official website 

Cup
Albania
1998-99